Kumboola Island is in the Family Islands group and located approximately 15 km North East of Tully Heads and immediately south of Dunk Island.  It is part of the Family Islands National Park. It is around 6 hectares or 0.06 square km in size.

The island contains areas of rainforest and transitional forests where eucalypt species are emerging.

See also

List of islands of Australia

References

Islands of Queensland
Islands of Far North Queensland
Protected areas of Far North Queensland